Lesley Smith (born 26 March 1957) is a Zimbabwean diver. She competed in the women's 3 metre springboard event at the 1984 Summer Olympics.

References

External links
 

1957 births
Living people
Zimbabwean female divers
Olympic divers of Zimbabwe
Divers at the 1984 Summer Olympics
Place of birth missing (living people)